"Kiwi" is a song recorded by English singer and songwriter Harry Styles for his self-titled debut album. The song was released as the third and final single from the album.

Background
The song is one of the more sexually overt songs on the album, and includes lyrics about cigarettes, liquor, a femme fatale, and a one night stand. Styles told BBC Radio 1 that the song "started out as a joke, now it’s one of my favourite songs. It’s one of the first ones I wrote for the album when I was getting out a lot of energy".

Music video
The music video for the song was released on 8 November 2017, directed by the filmmaking duo Us. It follows Styles and a group of children as they engage in large cake fight in Wimbledon Chase Primary School. Child actress Beau Gadsdon plays Styles' female lookalike in the video.

Live performances
In May 2017, Styles performed "Kiwi" on The Late Late Show with James Corden. In November, he performed the song on The X Factor UK and CBS Radio’s 5th annual We Can Survive concert at the Hollywood Bowl; held in honour of National Breast Cancer Awareness Month with proceeds going to Young Survival Coalition. The same month, Styles performed on the runway during the 2017 Victoria's Secret Fashion Show in Shanghai at the Mercedes-Benz Arena, opening the show with "Kiwi".

Commercial performance
The single was certified Gold in March 2020 in US and Silver in UK in April 2020.

Charts

Certifications

Release history

References

External links
 

2017 songs
2017 singles
Harry Styles songs
Columbia Records singles
Songs about casual sex
British hard rock songs
Songs written by Harry Styles
Songs written by Jeff Bhasker
Song recordings produced by Jeff Bhasker
Songs written by Tyler Johnson (musician)
Songs written by Alex Salibian